McCollin is a surname. Notable people with the surname include:

Andre McCollin (born 1985), English footballer
Frances McCollin (1892–1960), American composer and musician
Kalifa McCollin (born 1995), netball player from Trinidad and Tobago

See also
McCallin